Son Jeong-Ryun (born September 18, 1991) is a Japanese-born North Korean football player.

Club statistics

References

1991 births
Living people
Association football people from Yamaguchi Prefecture
North Korean footballers
Zainichi Korean people
J1 League players
J2 League players
Japan Football League players
Avispa Fukuoka players
Renofa Yamaguchi FC players
Association football midfielders